Alan Davies (4 February 1933 – 2 February 2009) was an English World Cup winning professional rugby league footballer who played in the 1950s and 1960s.

Background
Davies was born in Leigh, Lancashire, England, and he died aged 76 from Chronic obstructive pulmonary disease (emphysema) in hospital in Blackburn, Lancashire, England.

Playing career

International honours
Alan joined Oldham from Leigh amateur club Dootsons in July 1950 and made his senior debut on 9 September in the 35 - 8 victory over Wakefield, on the left-wing.

Alan Davies won caps for England while at Oldham in 1953 against Wales, in 1956 against France, and won caps for Great Britain while at Oldham in 1955 against New Zealand, in 1956 against Australia (3 matches), in the 1957 Rugby League World Cup against France, and Australia, in 1957 against France (2 matches), in 1958 against France, Australia (2 matches), and New Zealand (2 matches), in 1959 against France (2 matches), and Australia, in the 1960 Rugby League World Cup against New Zealand (1-try), France (2-tries), and Australia, and in 1960 against France.

Alan Davies played left-, i.e. number 4, in all three matches for Great Britain's 1960 Rugby League World Cup winning team.

Alan Davies also represented Great Britain while at Oldham between 1952 and 1956 against France (2 non-Test matches).

County League appearances
Alan Davies played in Wigan's victory in the Lancashire County League during the 1961–62 season.

Challenge Cup Final appearances
Alan Davies played left-, i.e. number 4, in Wigan's 10–25 defeat by Wakefield Trinity in the 1962–63 Challenge Cup Final during the 1962–63 season at Wembley Stadium, London on Saturday 11 May 1963, in front of a crowd of 84,492.

County Cup Final appearances
About Alan Davies' time, there was Oldham's 2–12 defeat by Barrow in the 1954–55 Lancashire County Cup Final during the 1954–55 season at Station Road, Swinton on Saturday 23 October 1954, the 10–3 victory over St. Helens in the 1956–57 Lancashire County Cup Final during the 1956–57 season at Station Road, Swinton on Saturday 20 October 1956, played right-, i.e. number 3, in the 12–2 victory over St. Helens in the 1958–59 Lancashire County Cup Final during the 1958–59 season at Station Road, Swinton on Saturday 25 October 1958, and played left-, i.e. number 4, and scored a try in Oldham's 13–8 victory over Wigan in the 1957–58 Lancashire County Cup Final during the 1957–58 season at Station Road, Swinton on Saturday 19 October 1957.

Honoured at Oldham
Davies is an Oldham Hall of Fame Inductee.

Personal life
Davies married his wife, Joyce, with whom he had four children; one son, Stephen, and three daughters, Linda, Sarah and Janice. After finishing his career in rugby, Alan became a Jehovah's Witness. Alan Davies was the son of the rugby league footballer who played in the 1920s and 1930s for Leigh; Harry "Cocky" Davies (named "Cocky" for his self-confidence), and the older brother of the rugby league footballer who played in the 1950s and 1960s for Leigh and Huddersfield; Gwyn Davies.

References

External links
Oldham Hall of Fame
Statistics at orl-heritagetrust.org.uk
Death Of Oldham Legend
Statistics at wigan.rlfans.com
Photograph Of 'Great Britain v New Zealand 1960 World Cup - Alan Davies of Oldham touches down for Great Britain in their 23-8 win over the Kiwis in front of 20,577 at Odsal. - Date: 01/01/1960' at rlhp.co.uk

1933 births
2009 deaths
England national rugby league team players
English rugby league players
Great Britain national rugby league team players
Oldham R.L.F.C. players
Rugby league centres
Rugby league five-eighths
Rugby league players from Leigh, Greater Manchester
Rugby league wingers
Salford Red Devils players
Wakefield Trinity players
Wigan Warriors players